Ceyrançöl is a village in the municipality of Saloğlu in the Agstafa Rayon of Azerbaijan.

References

Populated places in Aghstafa District